Morus australis, also called Korean mulberry and Chinese mulberry, is a flowering plant species in the genus Morus found in East and Southeast Asia.

The larvae of the freak (Calinaga buddha) feed on M. australis.

The substance "Australone A", a prenylflavonoid, can be found in M. australis.

Not a true mulberry (i.e. "Plants of the World Online" gives M. australis as a synonym of the accepted taxonomic designation, Broussonetia papyrifera, the paper mulberry), its fruits and leaves are edible, and it is used as feed in raising silkworms. It is widely used for fibre production, for paper and cloth. Both the Broussonetia and the Morus genera are within Moraceae family.

References

External links 

australis
Plants described in 1797
Trees of Nepal
Trees of Korea